Kalakundi is a village in Dharwad district of Karnataka, India.

Demographics 
As of the 2011 Census of India there were 129 households in Kalakundi and a total population of 608 consisting of 309 males and 299 females. There were 95 children ages 0-6.

References

Villages in Dharwad district